NGC 2082 is an intermediate spiral galaxy in the Dorado constellation.  It was originally thought to be part of the Dorado Group of galaxies, but was later removed. It was discovered on November 30, 1834 by John Herschel.

Supernova SN 1992ba, a Type II, was discovered by Robert Evans in NGC 2082.

See also 
 Intermediate spiral galaxy 
 List of NGC objects (2001–3000)
 Dorado (constellation)

References

External links 
 
 
 SEDS

Dorado (constellation)
Intermediate spiral galaxies
2082
Dorado Group
Discoveries by John Herschel
017609